The Waking Up Laughing Tour was the second headlining tour by American recording artist Martina McBride. Primarily visiting the United States and Canada, the tour supported her ninth studio album, Waking Up Laughing. The tour played over a hundred shows in 2007 and 2008, becoming one of the biggest tours by a country music artist—earning over eight million dollars and seen by over 250,000 spectators. Additionally, the tour placed 47th and 88th on Pollstar's Top 100 Tours in 2007 and 2008 respectively.

Background

The tour was announced through various media outlets on January 18, 2007, as McBride was promoting Anyway, the second single from her album. The tour marks the second time the singer has headlined a tour since her 2005 "Timeless Tour". Joining McBride on the road was Little Big Town and Rodney Atkins. Commenting on the tour, McBride stated: As exciting as it is to create a new album, there's nothing quite as thrilling as getting the immediate feedback from a live crowd. I'm especially happy about being joined by Little Big Town and Rodney Atkins. We put a lot of thought into which artists to include on this tour, and I really feel like this show is going to be a treat for my fans from beginning to end. I can't wait to get out there on the road." For the first time in the artist's career, McBride was joined on tour by her family. Her husband, John McBride was the sound engineer and her brothers Marty and Steve along with her three daughters. Although McBride competed against country music heavy hitters, Dolly Parton, Faith Hill and Tim McGraw, McBride's tour was named by Pollstar as the number one solo female country act for 2007. The success of the first leg lead to an expansion in 2008 with McBride playing arenas. This time around, McBride was joined by Lady Antebellum and Jack Ingram. The second leg saw McBride performing in Canada, her first performances since 2003. The tour received further accolades from Pollstar, becoming the 88th biggest tour in North America. The tour was expanded for a final time during the summer of 2008, with McBride playing amphitheaters and festivals in the United States. The tour ended at the Island Events Center (located at the Treasure Island Resort and Casino) in Red Wing, Minnesota with 120 performances.

Staging
The staging for McBride's tour was one of the most state of art for a country artist. The stage was created by Atomic Design, who created the stage for the singer's Timeless Tour. The stage featured the "Mitrix module". These were several video screens that mimicked louvers. Each screen as capable of "opening" and "closing" to reveal graphics and video content. The 12 video screens were positioned about a central screening, alluding the shape of a honeycomb. McBride was the very first artist to use this technology. When the screens were not in use,  they became transparent allowing light to shine through. The stage contained a proscenium arch that extended to a lifts on each side of the stage.

Opening acts

Jack Ingram (North America—Leg 1-3) (select dates)
Little Big Town (North America—Leg 1 and 3) (select dates)
Rodney Atkins (North America—Leg 1) (select dates)
Diamond Rio (North America—Leg 1) (select dates)
Warren Brothers (North America—Leg 1) (select dates)

Johnny Reid (Canada)
Emerson Drive (Canada)
Lady Antebellum (North America—Leg 2)
Jason Michael Carroll (North America—Leg 3)
Chris Young (North America—Leg 3)

Setlist

Additional notes
2007 leg
On occasion McBride would sing "Whatever You Say" instead of "Where Would You Be."
The songs "I Love You", "Thanks A Lot", "I Can't Stop Loving You", "Heartaches By The Number", "How Far" and "I'll Still Be Me" had early appearances.
"House of A Thousand Dreams", "Two More Bottles of Wine" "Over The Rainbow", "In My Daughter's Eyes", "Son of a Preacher Man", "Bridge Over Troubled Water" and "Stand By Your Man" at different shows.
"For These Times" was played during the start of the tour but then was cut and did not return until late 2007 when the song was released as a single
2008 leg
"Help Me Make It Through The Night" made an appearance early on in the second leg but it was soon replaced with "In My Daughter's Eyes."
"Tryin' To Find A Reason" was cut from the set list shortly after the second leg of the tour began.
Other songs played at various shows have been "Everybody Does", "I'll Still Be Me", "Today I Started Loving You Again", "Danny's Song", "I Love You", "Whatever You Say", "How I Feel" and "Safe in the Arms of Love"
Following "Lean on Me", McBride also included "The Warrior" and  "(You Make Me Feel Like) A Natural Woman" at select concerts. "Whatever You Say" was included in the first few set lists but was then replaced with "Valentine.
In Raleigh, McBride debuted the song "Ride".
At the final show in Red Wing, McBride performed "Wrong Again".

Tour dates

Festivals and other miscellaneous performances
 This concert was a part of the CMA Music Festival
 This concert was a part of the Country Music Fest USA
 This concert was a part of the Burlington Steamboat Days
 This concert was a part of the Country Thunder Music Festival
 This concert was a part of the OC Fair Summer Concert Series
 This concert was a part of the California Mid-State Fair
 This concert was a part of the Illinois State Fair Concert Series
 This concert was a part of the Delaware State Fair

Cancellations and rescheduled shows

Box office score data

Broadcasts and recordings

While on tour, McBride was asked to do a concert special for PBS. McBride previously participated in the station's Soundstage series in 2005. The concert would be a part of the Great Performances series in 2007. Filmed on September 29 at the iWireless Center in Moline, Illinois, McBride performed her standard setlist, including a performance of "Over the Rainbow". Titled Martina McBride: Live in Concert, the special aired on PBS in March 2008 to correlate with the station's quarterly pledge drive. A CD/DVD package was released later in April 2008 including a CD with highlights of the concert along with a DVD of the full show. The album peaked at the #19 position on Billboard's Country Albums chart.

Critical reception
Along with the tour's final success, the shows received further accolades from music critics. Timothy Finn (The Kansas City Star) was vowed by the premiere concert at the Kemper Arena. He comments, "McBride has earned her fame and made her fortune singing slicked-up modern country, but she is a traditionalist at heart, and she showed it resoundingly during those numbers; 'Stand By Your Man' was especially spectacular. But most of the feminine mystique came courtesy of country queen Martina McBride, the Kansas-born beauty whose crystalline vocal chords have earned her the nickname 'the Celine Dion of the CMT set.'" Brian Dugger (The Blade) viewed the performance at the SeaGate Convention Centre as "girl power" recalling, "But the night was mostly about McBride, who won points with the crowd by pointing out that she hasn’t been to Toledo in a while and promised that it won’t be as long for her return trip. At one point, after an extended ovation, she got a little emotional and had to take a short break until the crowd quieted down."

For the concert at the BJCC Arena, Mary Colurso (The Birmingham News)  felt McBride gave a crowd pleasing performance. He furthers writes, "Fans expected no less. The lovely singer radiates a wholesome, friendly charm that makes her seem safe and utterly approachable -- the superstar next door, we might say. McBride was at her best while singing two vintage covers: Loretta Lynn's 'You Ain't Woman Enough" and Kris Kristofferson's 'Help Me Make It Through the Night.'" Additional acclaim continue with the concert at the Radio City Music Hall. Mac Randall (Newsday) answered, "McBride's voice is honey-sweet and stunningly pure, and when she leaps into her upper register and milks a note for every possible ounce of emotion—as she did on "Where Would You Be" and "A Broken Wing"—it's guaranteed to get a crowd on its feet. There's more than a little Celine Dion in those big climactic sustained notes. Although McBride began her solo career in the early '90s as a country singer, newer songs such as "How I Feel", from her latest album Waking Up Laughing, have more in common with Benatar than Lynn."

It was McBride's range that won over Marie P. Grady  (The Republican) during the concert at the MassMutual Center. She explains, "As McBride raised her right hand high in the air—conjuring her vocal chords to reach the sky on a song called 'Where Would You Be'—it was clear this entertainer had the vocal range to match her star billing. Van Rose  (Times Leader) recalls McBride's voice being the highlight of the show at the Wachovia Arena. He continues, "Besides her amazing voice, one of the things that sets McBride apart from the rest of the country music singers is that she still possesses the enthusiasm of a newcomer. She put her heart and soul into every song and seemed to be genuinely having a good time. She also showed that she hasn’t lost her sense of humor. Before singing a duet with her younger brother on 'Trying to Find a Reason', a song off her new album in which she is joined by Keith Urban, she was able to make fun of herself. 'I feel kind of weird singing with my little brother' […] It's sort of an Angelina Jolie thing'."

As the tour began its second and final jaunt in 2008, McBride received more accolades for her concerts. Kate Darby  (Evansville Courier & Press)  thought highly of McBride for her concert at Roberts Municipal Stadium. She further comments, "The most striking thing about the performance was how different audience members reacted to her music. McBride is so natural that she seems to be addressing each person as an individual, which is a rare trait in a performer. Every person in the stadium was having an intensely personal experience while still feeding off of the energy of the people around them." Jack Leaver (The Grand Rapids Press)  continues the vocal praise for McBride for her performance at the VanAndel Arena. He writes, "Throughout the evening, McBride gave a powerhouse vocal demonstration, her Titanic-sized voice belying her petite 5-foot-4 frame. She also exhibited a great sense of humor, such as when she introduced her cover of Kris Kristofferson's classic "Help Me Make It Through the Night", which is featured on McBride's 2005 platinum-selling album Timeless."

Gary Budzak (The Columbus Dispatch) found the performance at the Nationwide Arena to be nothing short of "moving". He states, "There were other moving songs. On 'In My Daughter's Eyes', pictures of McBride's three daughters filled the back of her stage, and many mothers and their daughters held each other as she sang. The video for 'Concrete Angel' was shown as McBride sang about a child who was beaten to death, and many an eye filled with tears. Other anthem-like songs included 'Independence Day' and 'Anyway'." For one of her first shows in Canada in years, Theresa Taylor  (Jam!) gave McBride's show at the Pengrowth Saddledome three and a half out of five stars. She composed, "It was a diverse concert for fans who got their money's worth out of the three-act bill."

The same rating was shared by David Schmeichel  (Jam!)  for the singer's show at the MTS Centre. He explains, "Partly, the illusion could be chalked up to an abundance of female fans in the stands (and on the concourse, where the lines snaking out of the women's washrooms were at least three times as long as those for the merch tables)." Mario Tarradell  (Guide Live)''  commended McBride's show at the SuperPages.com Center. He elucidates, "But Ms. McBride is always the consummate entertainer on the platform. She's comfortable, vibrant, personable and a vocalist to respect."

Credits and Personnel
Crew
Production Designer: Tom McPhillips
Lighting Designer: Abigail Rosen Holmes
Art Director: Conway Allison and Tracy Baskette-Fleaner
Musical Director: Jim Medlin
Stage Manager: Pat O'Neil
Scenic Engineering & Soft Goods: Atomic Design, Inc.
Scenic Fabrication: Setco
Video: MooTV
Lighting Vendor: Bandit Lights

Band
Drums: Greg Herrington
Keyboards: Jim Medlin
Fiddle: Jenifer Wrinkle
Guitar: Greg Foresman
Acoustic guitar: Marty Schiff and Jenifer Wrinkle
Bass guitar: Glenn Snow
Steel guitar: Wayne Dahl
Supporting vocals: Greg Foresman, Marty Schiff, Glenn Snow and Jenifer Wrinkle

References

Martina McBride concert tours
2007 concert tours
2008 concert tours